Charles Pickering may refer to:

 Charles Pickering (naturalist) (1805–1878), physician and naturalist
 Charles Percy Pickering (1825–1908), Australian photographer, Art Gallery of New South Wales
 Charles W. Pickering (born 1937), Appeals Court judge
 Chip Pickering (born 1963), U.S. Representative from Mississippi, son of the judge
 Charles W. Pickering (United States Navy officer) (1815–1888), American Union Navy Civil War officer

See also
 Charlie Pickering (born 1977), Australian comedian